Linn Persson (born 27 June 1994) is a Swedish biathlete. Born in Torsby, she has competed in the World Cup, and represented Sweden at the 2016 World Championships.

Summer biathlon
In August 2019, she became Swedish champion at 15 kilometres distance during the Swedish national summer biathlon championships in Sollefteå.

Biathlon results
All results are sourced from the International Biathlon Union.

Olympic Games
2 medals (1 gold, 1 silver)

World Championships
4 medals (2 silver, 2 bronze)

*During Olympic seasons competitions are only held for those events not included in the Olympic program.
**The single mixed relay was added as an event in 2019.

World Cup

References

External links

1994 births
Swedish female biathletes
Biathletes at the 2012 Winter Youth Olympics
Biathletes at the 2018 Winter Olympics
Biathletes at the 2022 Winter Olympics
Olympic biathletes of Sweden
Medalists at the 2018 Winter Olympics
Medalists at the 2022 Winter Olympics
Olympic medalists in biathlon
Olympic gold medalists for Sweden
Olympic silver medalists for Sweden
People from Torsby Municipality
Living people
Biathlon World Championships medalists